The 234th Guards Air Assault Regiment is a formation of the Russian Airborne Forces. It is part of the 76th Guards Air Assault Division.

History 
The regiment was formed on 7 June 1946 in Novgorod as the 234th Guards Air-Landing Regiment of the 76th Guards Air Assault Division. In 1947, its garrison was moved to Pskov. In 1949 it was converted into an airborne regiment. In 2014, the regiment was involved in the Annexation of Crimea by the Russian Federation. It fought in the Russian invasion of Ukraine in 2022.The unit has lost several of its senior leadership in the war including Regiment Chief of Staff Lieutenant Colonel Igor Zharov and Regiment Deputy Commander Lieutenant Colonel Aleksey Afonin. 

Evidence suggests the unit participated in the Bucha massacre, specifically killing dozens of innocent civilians on Yablunska Street.

References 

Regiments of the Russian Airborne Troops
Military units and formations established in 1946
Airborne units and formations of the Soviet Union
Military units and formations of Russia in the war in Donbas